V. Saravanan (born 11 January 1978) is a former Malaysian football player. He currently as assistant coach for Perak FC since 5 January 2023.

Career
Saravanan spent the majority of his football career at Perak FA, winning two Malaysia Cup in 1998 and 2000. He also played for Kuala Lumpur FA, UPB-MyTeam FC, ATM FA and PKNS FC.

Saravanan also represents Malaysia 19 times from 1999 to 2004. His only international goals was against Thailand in a 2004 friendly match. Early in his career, he was in the Malaysia national under-21 football team that competes in the 1997 FIFA World Youth Championship, held in Malaysia.

He retired from professional football at the end of 2011 to move with his girlfriend to Finland.

Personal life
His girlfriend, Satu Johanna Ekholm is a physiotherapist from Finland, working with the National Sports Council of Malaysia. He is also the coach of a Helsinki-based junior football team Gnistan

International goals

References

External links
 
 Profile at Laman Web Peminat Bolasepak Perak Darul Ridzuan

Malaysian footballers
Malaysia international footballers
Perak F.C. players
PKNS F.C. players
Living people
1978 births
People from Johor
Malaysian people of Tamil descent
Malaysian sportspeople of Indian descent
Association football forwards